Dibba Al-Fujairah is a city in the emirate of Fujairah, located on the northeast part of the United Arab Emirates. It is geographically part of the Dibba region. Dibba Al-Fujairah is considered to be the second largest city in the emirate of Fujairah after Fujairah City. With an area of 68 square kilometres, Dibba Al-Fujairah had an estimated population of 41,017 (estimate) in July 2019. Dibba Al-Fujairah is mostly populated by the Al Dhanhani, Al Yammahi, Al Abdouli, Al Sereidi, Al Antali, Al Hindassi, and Al Zeyoudi tribes. 

Dibba Al-Fujairah has a number of suburbs and smaller neighborhoods, including Akamiya, Al-Rashidiya, Wasit, Al-Ghurfah, Sumbraid, Rul Dadna, Al-'Aqqah, Suwayfah, and Sharm. Akamiya features a health centre, capable of serving 2,000 patients, which opened in 2011 following delays caused by staff shortages.

See also 

 E 99 road (United Arab Emirates)

References 

Populated places in the Emirate of Fujairah
Archaeological sites in the United Arab Emirates
Oman–United Arab Emirates border crossings
Cities in the United Arab Emirates
Populated coastal places in the United Arab Emirates